L'altra metà del cielo (The other half of the sky) is a 1977 Italian comedy film directed by Franco Rossi.

It is loosely based on the comedy play Romancero by Jacques Deval.

Plot 
Don Vincenzo (Adriano Celentano), a priest sent in a mining village in Australia, seeks to redeem the Sicilian Susanna (Monica Vitti), aka Susy ...

Cast 
 Adriano Celentano: Don Vincenzo
 Monica Vitti: Susanna
 Venantino Venantini:  Mr. Recchia
 Paolo Paoloni:  Bishop of Sydney
 Mario Carotenuto:  William Donego
 Glauco Onorato:  Thief
 Gianfranco Barra:  Passenger
 Bill Vanders: Policeman

References

External links

1977 films
1977 comedy films
Italian films based on plays
Films based on works by Jacques Deval
Films directed by Franco Rossi
Italian comedy films
Films with screenplays by Maurizio Costanzo
1970s Italian-language films
1970s Italian films